The following is a list of accolades of American film, television, and stage actress Sarah Paulson.

From her acting career, Paulson has accumulated five Golden Globe Award nominations and eight Primetime Emmy Award nominations, receiving one of each for her role in The People v. O. J. Simpson: American Crime Story in 2016. Her work is mainly recognized in television, for series such as American Horror Story, Studio 60 on the Sunset Strip, and Game Change. In 2013, Paulson co-starred in the multiple Academy Award-winning film 12 Years a Slave, for which she was nominated for the Screen Actors Guild Award for Outstanding Performance by a Cast in a Motion Picture.

Major associations

Critics' Choice Television Awards

Golden Globe Awards

Primetime Emmy Awards

Screen Actors Guild Awards

Miscellaneous awards

Black Film Critics Circle Awards

Critics' Choice Super Awards

Dorian Awards

Fangoria Chainsaw Awards

Gotham Awards

Hollywood Critics Association TV Awards

Independent Spirit Awards

People's Choice Awards

Satellite Awards

Saturn Awards

Television Critics Association Awards

Women Film Critics Circle Awards

Diva Awards

See also
 Sarah Paulson filmography

References

Sources

Citations

External links

 
 
 

Lists of awards received by American actor